Nevadaville was a gold-mining town in Gilpin County, Colorado, United States.  It was also known in the 1860s and 1870s as Nevada City.  The post office at Nevadaville was called the Bald Mountain post office, to avoid confusion with other Nevadas and Nevadavilles.  The community is now largely a ghost town, although not completely deserted.  The Nevadaville Masonic Temple that started in 1861 still holds regular meetings.

History

Nevadaville started in 1859, soon after John H. Gregory found the first lode gold in what is now Colorado.  At the time, the townsite was in  western Kansas Territory.  The town grew to house the miners working the Burroughs lode and the Kansas lode.  The population was predominantly Irish.

The town was one of the most important mining settlements in the area.  A Masonic lodge was organized in 1859 from the Kansas Grand Lodge, becoming Nevada Number 36.  After only one regular meeting, the lodge relinquished their charter and came under the jurisdiction of the new Grand Lodge of Colorado who had taken over the territory.  The new charter was granted and the lodge became Nevada Lodge Number 4.  The lodge still holds meetings as the only Ghost town lodge in Colorado.

In 1861 a large fire destroyed 50+ buildings, (including naturalist and taxidermist Martha Maxwell's boardinghouse). However, residents made effective use of TNT to save the remaining parts of the city from the fire. Nevadaville rebuilt after fire destroyed a large piece of the town. A more serious threat to the town was the fact that the near-surface oxidized portions of the veins were worked out in the early 1860s.  The rudimentary ore mills had trouble recovering gold from the deeper sulfide ores.  The continued prosperity of Nevadaville was assured by the construction of successful ore smelters in nearby Black Hawk.

Nevadaville prospered until about 1900, after which the population declined sharply.

Geography

See also
List of ghost towns in Colorado

References

External links
 Rocky Mountain Profiles:  Nevadaville Colorado Townsite - Ghost town
 Ghosttowns.com:  Nevadaville
 Ancient Free and Accepted Masons of Colorado:  Nevada Lodge #4
 Western Mining History:  Nevadaville, Colorado
 Full Resolution Ghost Town and Historic Photos by Coloradopast.com

Ghost towns in Colorado
Former populated places in Gilpin County, Colorado
1859 establishments in Kansas Territory